Barbara Lorman (born 31 July 1932) is a former member of the Wisconsin State Senate.

Biography
Lorman was born on July 31, 1932 in Madison, Wisconsin. She graduated from Madison West High School before attending the University of Wisconsin-Madison and the University of Wisconsin-Whitewater. Lorman is married with three children and has been an active participant with Rotary International and the Boy Scouts of America.

Career
Lorman was self-described as a "former homemaker" and president of a metals recycling company when she was elected to the Senate in a special election in 1980, with 7,453 votes, to 5,562 for Democrat Janice Redford. She was the first female member of the Republican Party to be elected to the Wisconsin State Senate. She was assigned to the standing committee on energy, and to the Migrant Labor Council.

She was the first female senator to win re-election.

She continued to be a member until 1994, when she was defeated in a three-way Republican primary election by Scott L. Fitzgerald, with 6,098 votes for Fitzgerald, 5,613 for Herbert Feil and 5,494 votes for Lorman.

References

Politicians from Madison, Wisconsin
Republican Party Wisconsin state senators
Women state legislators in Wisconsin
University of Wisconsin–Madison alumni
University of Wisconsin–Whitewater alumni
1932 births
Living people
Madison West High School alumni
21st-century American women
20th-century American politicians
20th-century American women politicians